Boswell Observatory is located at Doane College in Crete, Nebraska. Built in 1883, it was primarily a time service observatory and student teaching observatory. The first telescope in the building was an  Alvan Clark.

The observatory is still used by the astronomy classes and is open to the public at different times throughout the year. It is no longer in operation as a weather station, but has been preserved well. The building is listed on the National Register of Historic Places as part of the Doane College Historic Buildings.

See also
 Doane College Historic Buildings
 List of astronomical observatories

References

Astronomical observatories in Nebraska
School buildings on the National Register of Historic Places in Nebraska
Buildings and structures in Saline County, Nebraska
Doane University
National Register of Historic Places in Saline County, Nebraska
1883 establishments in Nebraska